The Queen's School of Environmental Studies is a unit of the Faculty of Arts and Science at Queen's University at Kingston in Kingston, Ontario, Canada. The school offers an interdisciplinary approach to undergraduate and graduate studies dealing with the environment.

External links
 Official Queen's School of Environmental Studies website

School of Environmental Studies
Environmental studies institutions in Canada